The 1956 Ohio gubernatorial election was held on November 6, 1956. Republican nominee C. William O'Neill defeated Democratic nominee Michael DiSalle with 56.04% of the vote.

Primary elections
Primary elections were held on May 8, 1956.

Democratic primary

Candidates
Michael DiSalle, former Mayor of Toledo
John E. Sweeney, former Ohio Secretary of State
Robert W. Reider
Frank X. Kryzan, Mayor of Youngstown
Oscar L. Fleckner

Results

Republican primary

Candidates
C. William O'Neill, Ohio Attorney General
John William Brown, incumbent Lieutenant Governor

Results

General election

Candidates
C. William O'Neill, Republican 
Michael DiSalle, Democratic

Results

References

1956
Ohio
Gubernatorial